Fredericia is a town located in Fredericia Municipality in the southeastern part of the Jutland peninsula in Denmark. The city is part of the Triangle Region, which includes the neighbouring cities of Kolding and Vejle. It was founded in 1650 by Frederick III, after whom it was named.

The city itself has a population of 40,886 (1 January 2022) and the Fredericia Municipality has a population of 51,606 (2022).

History

After the devastation caused by the Thirty Years War in a largely unfortified Jutland, King Christian IV realized the necessity of building a strong fortress in Jutland, and decided that this project could be combined with his plans for building a large town in Jutland.

A fortified encampment was built on a point of land called Lyngs Odde, near the current location of Fredericia, with a rampart stretching to either side of the point, thus protecting the encampment from attacks.  However, the fortifications were not perfect, and when Swedish Field Marshal Lennart Torstenson invaded Jutland, he was able to break through the ramparts.  It was Frederick III who was finally able to complete the plans for the fortification, also adding a flank fortification on nearby Bers Odde as suggested by Danish Marshal of the Realm Anders Bille.

On 15 December 1650, the King signed the document giving the town its first privileges, and work on the new fortifications could begin.  In 1651, the town was named Frederiksodde (Frederick's Point) after the king, and on 22 April 1664, it was given the new Latinized name of Fredericia.

Every 6 July, the town of Fredericia holds a festival to commemorate the 1849 Battle of Fredericia, fought during the First War of Schleswig, in which Danish troops won a victory over the Schleswig-Holstein rebels who were laying siege to the town. Fredericia's landmark, Landsoldaten, was unveiled on 6 July 1858.

Present
The municipality today is part of the East Jutland metropolitan area with 1.2M inhabitants, and is the site of Fredericia municipality's municipal council.

The town is a major barracks, home to the Royal Danish Army's Signals Regiment (Telegrafregimentet), which is located at Rye's Barracks (Ryes Kaserne) and Bülow's Barracks (Bülows Kaserne).

Transportation
The town is one of Denmark's largest traffic hubs.

Rail

Fredericia railway station is the principal railway station of the town. It is an important railway junction where the Copenhagen-Fredericia Line, the Fredericia-Aarhus Line, and the Flensburg-Fredericia Line all meet. The station was opened in 1935 together with the opening of the Little Belt Bridge across the Little Belt. The train services are operated by the railway company DSB. It offers direct InterCity services to Copenhagen, Odense, Aarhus, Aalborg, Struer, Esbjerg, Sønderborg, Flensburg and Hamburg.

Air
The nearest airport with scheduled national and international flights is Billund Airport  45 km west of Fredericia.

Notable people

 Jens Mikkelsen Ehrenborg (1621 in Fredericia – 1690) an officer, civil servant, and Swedish nobleman
 Jørgen Balthazar Winterfeldt (1732 in Fredericia - 1821) a naval officer and philanthropist
 Hartvig Philip Rée (1778 in Fredericia – 1859) a Jewish-Danish merchant and author
 Poul Pagh (1796 in Fredericia – 1870) a Danish merchant and shipowner
 Frederick Brockhausen (1858 in Fredericia – 1929) a cigar maker, trade unionist and US politician
 Vilhelm Buhl (1881 in Fredericia – 1954) the 11th Prime Minister of Denmark
 Erik Holtved (1899 in Fredericia – 1981) an archaeologist, ethnologist and artist
 Jørgen Vig Knudstorp (born 1968 in Fredericia), businessman, former CEO of Lego Group

The Arts 

 Carit Etlar (1816 in Fredericia – 1900), Danish author of Gjøngehøvdingen in 1853
 Magdalene Thoresen (1819 in Fredericia – 1903) a Norwegian poet, novelist and playwright 
 Henrik Pontoppidan (1857 in Fredericia – 1943), a Danish realist writer, shared the 1917 Nobel Prize for Literature
 Svend Rathsack (1885 in Fredericia – 1941) a Danish sculptor
 Svend Melsing (1888 in Fredericia – 1946), actor, theatre director and playwright 
 Ellen Krause (1905 in Fredericia — 1990) a Danish artist, joined the Odsherred Painters 
 Else Holmelund Minarik (1920 in Fredericia – 2012) an American author of children's books
 Tage Skou-Hansen (1925 in Fredericia – 2015) a Danish writer, editor and scholar
 Cecil Bødker (born 1927 in Fredericia - 2020) a writer of young adult fiction and a poet 
 Erik Moseholm (1930 in Fredericia – 2012) a jazz composer, bandleader of the DR Big Band
 Harvey Martin (1942 - 2014), sculptor
 Kristian Blak (born 1947 in Fredericia) a composer and musician in the Faroe Islands 
 Martin Zandvliet (born 1971 in Fredericia) a Danish film director and screenwriter 
 Christian Holten Bonke (born 1973 in Fredericia) a documentary filmmaker and screenwriter 
Søren Andersen (born 1973 in Fredericia), Guitarist, Singer, Songwriter, Producer.

Sport 

 Jesper Bank (born 1957 in Fredericia) a sailor, twice Olympic gold medallist in 1992 and 2000
 Peter Kjær (born 1965 in Fredericia) a Danish former footballer with 459 club caps 
 Thomas Sørensen (born 1976 in Fredericia), football goalkeeper, 497 club caps and 101 for Denmark
 Patrick Hougaard (born 1989 in Fredericia) a Danish motorcycle speedway rider
 Annette Jensen (born 1991 in Fredericia) a Danish handball player
 Sara Thygesen (born 1991 in Fredericia) a badminton player, specializing in doubles play.
 Katrine Veje (born 1991 in Fredericia) a footballer, over 200 club caps and 119 for Denmark women

Twin towns

See also
Fredericia municipality

References

External links

 

 
Municipal seats of the Region of Southern Denmark
Municipal seats of Denmark
Cities and towns in the Region of Southern Denmark
Forts in Denmark
Port cities and towns in Denmark
Port cities and towns of the North Sea
Planned cities
Fredericia Municipality
1650 establishments in Europe
Populated places established in 1650